The 2008 Carlisle City Council election took place on 1 May 2008 to elect members of Carlisle District Council in Cumbria, England. One third of the council was up for election and the council stayed under no overall control.

After the election, the composition of the council was:
Labour 21
Conservative 21
Liberal Democrats 7
Independent 1
Vacant 2

Background
Before the election the Labour Party held 25 seats, compared to 19 Conservatives, 7 Liberal Democrats and 1 independent. However the Conservatives had run the council since 1999, latterly with the support of the Liberal Democrats.

17 seats were scheduled to be contested, with Labour needing 1 gain to probably be able to take control. 3 councillors stood down at the election, Conservative Judith Prest from Brampton ward and Labour's John Reardon and Ray Warwick from Upperby and Yewdale wards respectively. As well as candidates from the Labour, Conservative and Liberal Democrat parties, there were also 9 candidates from the British National Party, 1 from the English Democrats and 4 independents, including the only sitting independent councillor, Bill Graham in Hayton.

Campaign
Labour targeted the seat of Morton from the Liberal Democrats, while campaigning on pledges to establish a theatre/arts centre and to review the Carlisle Renaissance programme, which would see 100 new homes built every year for a decade. However the Conservatives aimed to take Belle Vue and Yewdale from Labour, and Dalston from the Liberal Democrat group leader Trevor Allison. The Conservatives defended their record in control of the council, pointing to council tax increases being kept down and increased recycling rates. Meanwhile, the Liberal Democrats promised to campaign against the closure of post offices.

During the campaign the British National Party candidate for Upperby, Les Griffiths, died and as a result the election in Upperby was postponed. In the week before the election one of the Labour councillors for Upperby, June Martlew, also died and as a result both seats were set to be filled at a by-election on 12 June after the main council election had taken place.

Election result
The Conservatives gained 2 seats from Labour to move level with Labour on 21 seats. The Conservative gains came in Belle Vue by 62 votes and in Yewdale, which they took by 42 votes after having fallen 10 votes short in 2007. These were the first urban seats the Conservatives had held south of the River Eden since 2004. Elsewhere the Conservatives came within 66 votes of defeating the Labour group leader Michael Boaden in Botcherby and the Conservative parliamentary candidate for Carlisle parliamentary constituency, John Stevenson, easily held his seat in Stanwix Urban. The Conservatives put their gains down to the unpopularity of the national Labour government and saw the results as a good sign for the next general election, as they were 1,481 votes ahead of Labour in the wards that made up Carlisle constituency.

Meanwhile, the Liberal Democrats stayed on 7 seats after holding all 3 seats they had been defending, with their group leader Trevor Allison increasing his majority to 223 in Dalston, from just 1 when he took the seat in 2004. Independent Bill Graham was the only other candidate elected, holding his seat in Hayton comfortably, but the British National Party did come second in Currock, for the second election in a row, with an increased 28% of the vote. Overall turnout at the election was 38.1%, an increase from 35.5% in 2007.

Following the election Conservative Mike Mitchelson was re-elected as leader of the council, with the Liberal Democrats continuing to have a seat on the council executive.

Ward results

By-elections between 2008 and 2010

Upperby
A by-election in Upperby was held on 12 June 2008 for 2 seats on the council, after the deaths of a British National Party candidate during the council election campaign, and then the death of Labour councillor June Martlew. Labour held both seats, with a reduced majority, thereby becoming the largest party on the council with 23 seats, compared to 21 for the Conservatives.

Belah and Castle
By-elections were held in Belah and Castle wards on 5 March 2009, after the death of Conservative councillor for Belah, Sandra Fisher, in December 2008, and the resignation of Liberal Democrat councillor for Castle, Kimberly Hunter, in January 2009. Both seats were held by the defending party, Conservative Gareth Ellis in Belah and Liberal Democrat Colin Farmer in Castle, with Labour finishing second in both seats.

References

2008 English local elections
2008
2000s in Cumbria